Tuckahoe is an unincorporated community in Greenbrier County, West Virginia, United States.

The community most likely was named after nearby Tuckahoe Run creek.

References

Unincorporated communities in Greenbrier County, West Virginia
Unincorporated communities in West Virginia